Virginia Tovar Martín (1929–2013) was a Spanish art historian, author, and professor. She was a foremost scholar in the study of architecture and urban planning of Madrid during the Baroque period (c. 1600–1750). Tovar Martín was a Professor of History of Art at the Complutense University of Madrid; and at Autonomous University of Madrid.

Biography 
Virginia Tovar Martín was born on November 29, 1929 in Bérchules, Andalusia, Spain.

In her early scholarly work she focused on architect Juan Gómez de Mora. In 1986, she curated an exhibition of Juan Gómez de Mora's work. Tovar Martín emphasized the importance of 18th century Spanish art and architecture, and she felt Spanish art of this time period deserved a place within the canon of Western art.

Tovar Martín died on July 10, 2013 in the town of Galapagar.

Publications

See also 
 Women in the art history field

References 

1929 births
2013 deaths
Complutense University of Madrid alumni
Academic staff of the Complutense University of Madrid
Spanish women historians
Women art historians
Historians of Spain